Serbi may refer to:

Serbs, a South Slavic ethnic group in the Balkans
Sorbs, a West Slavic ethnic group in the eastern Germany
Serboi, a historical Sarmatian/Alanian group in the Caucasus
Šerbi, the vocalist of the Slovene pop group Agropop
Alternate form of Xianbei, an ancient people that lived in Manchuria and Mongolia.